Jaicós is a municipality in the state of Piauí in the Northeast region of Brazil.

It was named after the Jaikó people who used to occupy the area.

See also
List of municipalities in Piauí

References

Municipalities in Piauí